is a Japanese actress, voice actress and narrator who works for Aoni Production. She was born in Yokohama and is best known for her roles as Ran Mouri in Detective Conan, Atsuko "Akko" Kagami in the 1998 version of Himitsu no Akko-chan, Maria and Shoryuuki in Ghost Sweeper Mikami, Azumi Kojou in Azumi Mamma Mia, Meiko Akizuki in Marmalade Boy and Ayane in Dead or Alive. Yamazaki also took over the role of Nami for episodes 70-78 of One Piece while regular voice actress Akemi Okamura was on maternity leave.

Filmography

Main Current Role

TV Series animation

Detective Conan's Film Series

Crossover Film

OVA

Unknown Year

Film animation

Video games

Drama CDs

Live action voices

Radio

References

External links
 

1965 births
Living people
Voice actresses from Yokohama
Japanese video game actresses
Japanese voice actresses
20th-century Japanese actresses
21st-century Japanese actresses
Aoni Production voice actors